House at 115 South Main Street is a historic home located at Canastota in Madison County, New York.  It was built in the mid-1850s and remodeled in the 1880s in the Queen Anne and Eastlake styles.  It is a modest -story structure surmounted by a multi-gabled roof, which is pierced by a -story tower.

It was added to the National Register of Historic Places in 1986.

References

Houses on the National Register of Historic Places in New York (state)
Houses completed in 1855
Houses in Madison County, New York
National Register of Historic Places in Madison County, New York